Jewan is a village in Powayan tehsil, in Shahjahanpur district of Uttar Pradesh, India.

Demography
It had in 1901 a population of 2133 persons, out of which 213 were musalmans and the rest being principally katehria rajputs and brahmans. In 1931 the total population was 1870 out of which there were 243 Muslims. According to the 2011 census, its population was about 4000.

History
Jewan was established by Raja Shambhu Shah, the youngest of the three sons of the Nahil estate, and a descendant of Rao Gopal Singh, as a camping and hunting site that later became a village. Raja Shambhu Shah died while fighting Rohilla Pathans.
The history of family was also excerpted from the local district gazettes.

Geography

Plantation

The family of Jewan Kothi owns acres of farmland in Jewan and nearby villages, where crops like wheat, rice and sugarcane are grown. The family also owns mango plantation farms known as Mutua and Noudha, in the outskirts of Jewan. Math K Baagh is a part of the former mango farmland (which had 100,000 mango trees), which was later turned into crop-growing fields. It is also the personal crematorium site of the family. The family of Jewan Kothi also owns a multi-acre crop land called "Jhabar", which used to be a jungle with a very large lake, where royal elephants were brought to graze on long grass.

Education
Kunwar Durga Bux Singh Degree College is a college affiliated with Rohilkhand University.  The college is operated under Kunwar Rameshwar Singh Trust. Kunwar Balvir Singh is the founder and director of this college.

Gallery

See also 
Powayan
Khutar

References

Villages in Shahjahanpur district